Lles de Cerdanya (formerly known as simply Lles) is a Pyrrenean village in the comarca of Cerdanya, province of Lleida, Catalonia, north-eastern Spain. It is located south of the border with Andorra and France and home to two ski resorts, Lles and Aransa.

References

Panareda Clopés, Josep Maria; Rios Calvet, Jaume; Rabella Vives, Josep Maria (1989). Guia de Catalunya, Barcelona: Caixa de Catalunya.  (Spanish).  (Catalan).

External links
 
 Government data pages 

Municipalities in Cerdanya (comarca)
Municipalities in the Province of Lleida
Populated places in the Province of Lleida